Sophie Abelson is an English actress. She is known for portraying the role of Cherry Clay in the BBC soap opera Doctors from 2009 to 2012. For her role as Cherry, she received a nomination for the British Soap Award for Best Newcomer.

Life and career
Born in Ainsdale, Merseyside, to Laurence and Dorothy, she has a brother, Dan. Abelson studied at Kingswood Junior School and Greenbank High School before completing a degree in BA (Hons) Media and Drama at the University of Salford. After touring nationally with her theatre schools, Abelson began her professional career in theatre, including appearances in Death of a Salesman for York Theatre Royal, the David Freeman production of As You Like It, the Braham Murray production of She Stoops to Conquer for Royal Exchange Manchester, and the Carole Rodd tour of Girls Night Out.

In 2006, she starred as actress Barbara Windsor in the Paul Hunter production of 2006 revival of the Olivier Award-winning comedy Cleo, Camping, Emmanuelle and Dick at the Octagon Bolton, for which she received many positive reviews. Abelson appeared in the second episode of HBO's 2013 mockumentary-style television comedy Family Tree, playing policewoman WPC Sharon Bullivant in the 1970s show-within-the-show Move Along, Please!. In a July 2007 episode of BBC's daytime soap opera Doctors, she played the role of Tilly Ruffell. She was brought back to the series in 2009 in the regular role of Cherry Malone. For her role as Cherry, Abelson was nominated for Best Newcomer and Sexiest Female at 2010 British Soap Awards. Abelson left Doctors on 19 October 2012.

Filmography

Awards and nominations

References

External links
 

21st-century English actresses
Alumni of the University of Salford
English Jews
English stage actresses
English television actresses
English soap opera actresses
Living people
People from Southport
Year of birth missing (living people)